Events from the year 1703 in Canada.

Incumbents
French Monarch: Louis XIV
English, Scottish and Irish Monarch: Anne

Governors
Governor General of New France: Louis-Hector de Callière
Governor of Acadia: Jacques-François de Monbeton de Brouillan
Colonial Governor of Louisiana: Jean-Baptiste Le Moyne de Bienville
Governor of Plaisance: Daniel d'Auger de Subercase

Events
 May 26 - Louis-Hector de Callière, Governor General of New France, dies in office.
 May 27 - Philippe de Rigaud Vaudreuil becomes Governor General of New France.

Births
 June 6 - Louis de la Corne, Chevalier de la Corne, explorer (died 1761).

Deaths
 May 26 - Louis-Hector de Callière, Governor General of New France (born 1648)

References 

 
03